The following highways are numbered 654:

United States